Ignashevskaya is a rural locality (a village) in Dvinitskoye Rural Settlement, Syamzhensky District, Vologda Oblast, Russia. The population was 10 as of 2002.

Geography 
Ignashevskaya is located 45 km northeast of Syamzha (the district's administrative centre) by road. Rogovitsynskaya is the nearest rural locality.

References 

Rural localities in Syamzhensky District